Point Isabel Regional Shoreline in Richmond, California, is operated by East Bay Regional Park District, and is a multi-use park for joggers, windsurfers, kayakers, photographers, picnickers, and people walking dogs. It has access for pedestrians and via public transit, private vehicles, and bikes (although bike-riding within Point Isabel itself is not allowed). It also features a concession offering food for people and grooming for pets. A longtime community organization and nonprofit, Point Isabel Dog Owners and Friends (PIDO), is active in the maintenance and improvement of the park.

Point Isabel was closed from March 31, 2020 to June 1, 2020, as a precaution during the early days of the COVID-19 pandemic. Dogs were required to be on-leash during the first week after the reopening but off-leash privileges were restored on June 8, 2020. As throughout East Bay Regional Park District, social distancing measures apply.

History
This now    park was incorporated into the East Bay Regional Park District (EBRPD) in 1975. The United States Postal Service operates a large bulk mail facility adjacent to what is now Point Isabel Regional Shoreline. As mitigation for the construction of this large facility on the shoreline, USPS offered to lease what is now Point Isabel Regional Shoreline free of charge to the EBRPD until 2025. The lease came with the condition of free public access.

Originally 23 acres, Point Isabel officially added the roughly 26 acres of North Point Isabel (sometimes called Battery Point) in 2002 when McLaughlin Eastshore State Park (then Eastshore State Park) was created. North Point Isabel is across the narrow Hoffman Channel from Point Isabel proper and accessed via a short footbridge or from the Bay Trail.

Both Point Isabel and North Point Isabel, like many parks along the East Bay shoreline, are landfill. For years North Point Isabel was a dumping ground for industrial waste—the "Battery Point" name referred to battery casings—and underwent an intensive cleanup and clay-capping operation in the mid-1980s. Two of the toxins of concern in the area were lead and zinc. The fenced-off area just north of the public restrooms at the Rydin Road end of the park is dirt that was dug more recently when the restrooms were installed. The dirt pile tested positive for high levels of contaminants and was fenced off, planted, and is permanently off-limits. Other small areas of North Point Isabel have been fenced off either because they tested positive for lead or zinc or to prevent further erosion of the clay cap and edges of the landfill.

The park has seen many improvements over the years, including the building of permanent buildings for the Mudpuppy's Tub & Scrub dog wash and adjacent Sit & Stay Café; permanent bathrooms on both ends of the park (Isabel Street and Rydin Road); trail repaving on the Point Isabel side; and parking lot repaving and restriping. The bridge across the Hoffman Channel was reinforced in 2019 to ensure it could hold emergency vehicles on the adjacent Bay Trail (along the Hoffman Marsh). The informal launching area for nonmotorized watercraft (primarily windsurfers and kayaks) was significantly improved around 2018, including shoring up the edges of the landfill, installing a pea gravel area for windsurfers to stage their equipment, a broad, concrete ramp to the water's edge, and paved sidewalks out to the launch area. 

Park usage has increased exponentially from an estimated 500,000 human visitors in 2000 to some 1,400,000 10 years later, according to EBRPD estimates. It is used heavily by people walking dogs but also by walkers, joggers, windsurfers, kayakers, photographers, birdwatchers, and picnickers.
A few years ago it underwent some US $500,000 worth of capital improvements, including new irrigation systems and turf, fox tail removal, trail repavement, picnic sites and café seating. That was funded by a portion of US $225 million collected by Measure AA (1998)

Point Isabel regularly makes the list of the top best places in the U.S. to walk dogs off-leash. It was named the number one dog park by People for the Ethical Treatment of Animals (PETA) in 2006.

It is named for the natural promontory of Point Isabel, which was itself named for  landowner Víctor Castro's daughter Isabel. During the Gold Rush, the Castros operated a ferry from Point Isabel to send supplies from their ranch to San Francisco. For many years a pottery company, Tepco, operated near where the water treatment plant is today. Shards of broken pottery are still frequently found along the western shoreliner.

The remains of Laci Peterson washed up at Point Isabel in 2003, and those of her unborn son, Connor, were found a short distance north along the shoreline.

Overview

The park is located along the eastern shore of the San Francisco Bay in the East Bay region of the Bay Area and is administered by East Bay Regional Park District. The park consists of two halves of roughly equal size—Point Isabel and North Point Isabel—separated by the narrow Hoffman Channel. Hoffman Channel is the outlet of Fluvius Innominatus creek from its mouth at the edge of its delta, Hoffman Marsh The shoreline of the entire park is lined with boulders, broken concrete blocks, and other riprap.

The northern shore of the park against Hoffman Channel was formerly a sandy beach and has been modified from its original state by leveling and in-filling of the surrounding mudflats, tidal flats and other wetlands. 
The rest of the peninsula consists of the Bay Trail, a water treatment facility, radio towers, a US Postal Service facility, a Costco store, and office buildings. The parkland has an elevation of 16–25 feet (5–8 meters).

The park is open between 5 am and 10 pm PST; admission and parking are free, as stipulated by the lease agreement. The park is fully wheelchair accessible.

Point Isabel features two businesses aimed at visitors: Mudpuppy's Tub and Scrub, which is a dog grooming retail store and outlet, and the Sit & Stay Café, which offers drinks and sandwiches.

The park offers striking panoramic views of Marin County mountains, San Francisco and the Golden Gate Bridge. There are 3.2 miles (5.1 km) of flat trails which are generally wheelchair accessible and stroller friendly. The San Francisco Bay Trail  wraps around Point Isabel Regional Shoreline.

The park supplies bags for picking up animal waste. These bags cost the EBRPD about US$34,000 annually, to which the Point Isabel Dog Owners group contributes.

Park rules
The park is open from 5:00 a.m. to 10 p.m. every day unless otherwise posted. Bicycling is not allowed in Point Isabel Regional Shoreline, but bikes can loop around the fenced park on a spur of the Bay Trail. Leashes are optional for dogs throughout the park but dogs must be leashed in the parking lots Dog walkers are limited to three dogs each (although EBRPD issues permits for individuals and professionals to walk up to six dogs apiece).  Visitors with dogs must carry a leash for each dog; must clean up their pets' waste; must prevent their dogs from digging; and must immediately fill any holes dug by their pets. Dogs who become aggressive must be leashed immediately. Dogs are allowed to swim in the Bay, in Hoffman Channel at high tide, and in Hoffman Bay (the northern edge of North Point Isabel) at high tide. Dogs may not harass birds at any time; are never allowed in Hoffman Marsh (on the other side of the Bay Trail from Point Isabel); and must not disturb birds feeding in the Hoffman Bay mudflats or Hoffman Channel at low tide.

Transportation

The park was served by AC Transit's 25 bus line, which linked it to the El Cerrito Plaza BART station and Downtown Berkeley. The park is also accessible by car via I-80 and I-580 from the Central Avenue exit. There is parking in two parking lots and additional street parking. Car break-ins have been an issue at both parking lots. There are bike racks on the Isabel Street end of the park.

The park connects to the San Francisco Bay Trail leading into the Marina Bay neighborhood northwestwards into Richmond and southwards toward Albany and through Berkeley to Emeryville.

PIDO

Point Isabel Dog Owners and Friends (PIDO) is a 501(c)(3) nonprofit organization with approximately 6,000 members. PIDO was founded in 1985 when Point Isabel was made on-leash-only and by 1987 successfully negotiated off-leash, multi-use status for Point Isabel again. PIDO has worked for more than 30 years to raise funds for park maintenance, educate park users, and keep the park clean and safe. (Point Isabel has been noted in the media for its safety, lack of vandalism, and cleanliness.)

When off-leash access to North Point Isabel was in jeopardy during the creation of what is now McLaughlin Eastshore State Park in 2002, PIDO collected 20,000 signatures to preserve multi-use recreation. When the City of Richmond planned to rezone the Point Isabel promontory some years later to allow a Kohl's department store on Rydin Road and fast-food restaurants, PIDO joined forces with neighborhood groups and environmentalists to preserve and protect the area.

PIDO assists the EBRPD in funding poop bags and promotes their use to visitors. (Self-policing by park-goers and PIDO members has been credited with making the park dog waste-free.) PIDO maintains two bulletin boards at Point Isabel; two others are dedicated to the use of the EBRPD. PIDO sponsors annual Canine Good Citizen testing and accreditation for dogs; holds regular park cleaning and weed-pulling events; in 2015 held an Easter egg hunt for the first time for dog-friendly kids and kid-friendly dogs; and every year hosts a popular dog costume contest and parade called "Barktoberfest" around Halloween. PIDO helps educate park-goers via The PIDO Pointer, a newsletter published three times a year and distributed to all members as well as being available on the bulletin boards at Point Isabel.

See also
Point Isabel, the promontory on which the park is situated.

Notes

External links 
 Point Isabel Regional Shoreline at the East Bay Regional Parks District website
 Mudpuppy's Tub & Scrub and Sit & Stay Café

 Trails map
 Point Isabel at bay Hiker, report, images
 Pbase, photos
 Pido.org Point Isabel Dog Owners and Friends
 Point Isabel commentary at Yelp.com

East Bay Regional Park District
Parks in Richmond, California
Dog parks in the United States
San Francisco Bay Trail
Protected areas established in 1975
1975 establishments in California